Idzard Louis Douwe Sirtema van Grovestins (22 January 1893 – 6 October 1983) was a Dutch equestrian. He competed in the individual eventing event at the 1920 Summer Olympics.

References

External links
 
 
 Idzard Sirtema van Grovestins at WeRelate

1893 births
1983 deaths
Dutch male equestrians
Olympic equestrians of the Netherlands
Equestrians at the 1920 Summer Olympics
Sportspeople from The Hague